Adieu Bonaparte or Bonaparte in Egypt (translit.Weda'an Bonapart) is a 1985 Egyptian-French historical drama film directed by Youssef Chahine and starring Michel Piccoli, Salah Zulfikar, Mohsen Mohieddin and Patrice Chéreau. It was entered into the 1985 Cannes Film Festival. It was later selected for screening as part of the Cannes Classics section at the 2016 Cannes Film Festival.

Cast
 Michel Piccoli as Cafarelli
Salah Zulfikar as Cheikh Hassouna
Mohsen Mohieddin as Ali
 Patrice Chéreau as Napoléon Bonaparte
 Mohsena Tewfik as La mère
 Christian Patey as Horace
 Gamil Ratib as Barthelemy
 Taheya Cariocca as La sage femme
 Huda Sultan as Nefissa
 Claude Cernay as Decoin
 Mohamad Dardiri as Sheikh Charaf
 Hassan El Adl as Cheikh Aedalah
 Tewfik El Dekn as Le Derwiche (as Tewfik El Dekken)
 Seif El Dine as Kourayem (as Seif Eddina)
 Hassan Husseiny as Le père
 Farid Mahmoud as Faltaos

See also
 Salah Zulfikar filmography
 Youssef Chahine filmography
 List of Egyptian films of the 1980s

References

External links

1985 films
French war films
1980s Arabic-language films
French multilingual films
Egyptian multilingual films
1985 multilingual films
1980s French-language films
French Revolutionary Wars films
Films set in the 1800s
Films set in Egypt
Films directed by Youssef Chahine
Egyptian war films
1980s French films